Lenham Heath is a hamlet in Kent situated on the southern edge of the North Downs, halfway between Maidstone and Ashford. .

The road through Lenham Heath runs parallel, and close to High Speed 1 and the  M20 motorway. The Stour Valley Walk passes through the community.

Hamlets in Kent